Pedro Bengui (born 2 March 1993) is an Angolan footballer who plays as a midfielder. He is also a member of the Angola national team.

References

External
 
 

1993 births
Angolan footballers
Association football midfielders
Living people
Kategoria Superiore players
Expatriate footballers in Albania
Angolan expatriate footballers
Angolan expatriate sportspeople in Albania
Angolan expatriate sportspeople in Cyprus
Expatriate footballers in Cyprus
Angola international footballers
Luftëtari Gjirokastër players
G.D. Interclube players